Adrenergic release inhibitors are a class of drugs which inhibit the release of epinephrine (adrenaline) and/or norepinephrine (noradrenaline) from adrenergic nerve terminals and are used as antihypertensives. Examples of these agents include bethanidine, bretylium, debrisoquine, guanadrel, guanazodine, guancydine, guanethidine, guanoclor, and guanoxan. Most agents of this class are guanidinium compounds and have little capacity to cross the blood–brain barrier.

References

Adrenergic release inhibitors